McGee School, also known as Coffin's Grove Township, District #1,  is a one-room schoolhouse located west of Manchester, Iowa, United States.  Built in 1868 in a folk-vernacular style, it is a rare example of a brick one-room schoolhouse in Iowa, and the only on left in Delaware County.   Also rare is the tall Romanesque arched entryway, which led to a cloakroom on either side.  The building is also significant as the only known school associated with Sarah Gillespie Huftalen, a rural school advocate and educator, who taught here from 1883 to 1884.  It was listed on the National Register of Historic Places in 1999.

References

School buildings completed in 1868
One-room schoolhouses in Iowa
School buildings on the National Register of Historic Places in Iowa
Schools in Delaware County, Iowa
National Register of Historic Places in Delaware County, Iowa
Vernacular architecture in Iowa